The biwa is a Japanese short-necked fretted lute.

Biwa may also refer to:

 Biwa, Shiga, a town in Shiga Prefecture, Japan
 Biwa trout, an anadromous fish in the salmon family enzootic to Lake Biwa
 Eric Biwa, a former Namibian politician
 Lake Biwa, a lake in Shiga Prefecture, Japan
 Loquat or biwa, a fruit tree in the subfamily Maloideae of the family Rosaceae, indigenous to southeastern China